The Premier League Young Player of the Season is an annual English football award, presented to the best player aged 23 or younger in the Premier League. For sponsorship purposes, it is known as the Hublot Young Player of the Season since the 2020–21 season, after being known as TAG Heuer Young Player of the Season right after its inception during the 2019–20 season. Trent Alexander-Arnold of Liverpool was the first winner of the award.

Winners

Awards won by nationality

Awards won by club

See also
Premier League Player of the Season
League Managers Association Awards

References

Young
Premier League trophies and awards
Association football player non-biographical articles
Association football young player of the year awards
Rookie player awards